Charlotte Broman Mølbæk (born 29 November 1977 in Aarhus) is a Danish politician, who is a member of the Folketing for the Socialist People's Party. She was elected into parliament at the 2019 Danish general election.

Political career
Mølbæk was a member of the municipal council of Randers Municipality from 2014 to 2019. She was elected into parliament at the 2019 election, where she received 2,641 personal votes.

References

External links 
 Biography on the website of the Danish Parliament (Folketinget)

1977 births
Living people
People from Aarhus
Socialist People's Party (Denmark) politicians
Danish municipal councillors
21st-century Danish women politicians
Women members of the Folketing
Members of the Folketing 2019–2022
Members of the Folketing 2022–2026